Neible Parish, New South Wales  is a civil parish of Napier County, a county located in central western New South Wales.

References

Localities in New South Wales
Geography of New South Wales
Central West (New South Wales)